Scanchitonidae is an extinct family of polyplacophoran mollusc.

References 

Chitons
Prehistoric mollusc families